The 1989 World Table Tennis Championships were held in Dortmund from March 29 to April 9, 1989.

Results

Team

Individual

References

External links
ITTF Museum

 
World Table Tennis Championships
World Table Tennis Championships
World Table Tennis Championships
1989 in German sport
Table tennis competitions in Germany
International sports competitions hosted by West Germany
Sports competitions in Dortmund
1980s in North Rhine-Westphalia
20th century in Dortmund
March 1989 sports events in Europe
April 1989 sports events in Europe